KOJM (610 AM) is a radio station licensed to serve Havre, Montana.  The station is owned by New Media Broadcasters, Inc. It airs a classic hits music format. The broadcast studios are located north of town, at 2210 31st Street North. This facility is shared with its sister stations. The transmitter and two towers are also at this location.

KOJM was the first AM radio station in Montana to broadcast with HD Radio in the summer 2004.

A little history detail as follows for KOJM. Prior to its classic hits format, KOJM is once formerly a Top-40 station with an affiliate of American Top 40 with Casey Kasem since the week of March 9, 1985.

The station was assigned the KOJM call letters by the Federal Communications Commission.

References

External links
KOJM official website
New Media Broadcasters, Inc.

OJM
Classic hits radio stations in the United States
Hill County, Montana
Radio stations established in 1983